Vector Meldrew is a British artist and creative executive. He was a former lecturer at the Swedish design institute Hyper Island, and the creator of grime website RWD Magazine, as well as the associated RWD Forum. He is an established crypto artist and has auctioned his work at Bonhams.

Career

UK Grime scene 
In 2001, Vector became founding member of RWD magazine created to push UK garage, grime and dubstep, and RWD became the first platform to champion grime music and feature UK artists Dizzee Rascal, Skepta and Tinchy Stryder.

During this period the website received London Business of the Year, UK Garage Awards : Best Website 2002 and Sidewinder Peoples Choice Awards : Best Magazine 2003 "Ernst & Young Future 100" Award in 2011.

Channel U commissioned Vector's first animation series working in collaboration with Matt Mason (writer) and Julian Johnson (Art). Taking hints from underground music culture and the intersection between UK Garage and Grime, the 3 episode web series was shortly co-signed by Missy Elliott after her PR team asked to feature the artist as part of the campaign for her hit single 'Work It'. The series then acquired a 6-episode deal on Channel U (now named Total Country) and recorded a music video with UK Garage producer 'Sticky' known for hits such as Ms Dynamite's track (also named) 'Boo'. Music publication Ransom Note  cited the series as the first 'grime comedy' saying it was 'essentially a proto(type) version of People Just Do Nothing"

James Bond - GoldenEye 
Vector worked as a motion graphics director with video game developer Eurocom ,  commissioned by Activision to work with the James Bond franchise to develop GoldenEye 007 and 007 Legends.

From 2009 to 2013 Vector worked as a freelance consultant providing strategy for various fashion brands   creating campaigns such as the 'adidas About to Blow London Olympics 2012' campaign featuring Tinie Tempah and Mo Farah. He created a handful of films entitled 'Monotone' 'Monkey Business' and 'Do Not Feed The Horses'. Screenings include : AniFest, Resfest, British Film Council and Channel Frederator  The business school Hyper Island recruited Vector between 2014–2017  to teach 'storytelling' to the motion creative course in Stockholm/Karlskrona.

Dubstep / EDM 
Vector was responsible for design collaborations with dubstep / techno artists such as Appleblim, Headhunter, Pinch, Komonazmuk, Joker (Kapsize) and 2562. The most notable being an Audio Visual live show with Headhunter (Tempa) now called Addison Groove. He also directed music videos for Appleblim and Addison Groove. The most notable was 'Changa' which premiered on the Adult Swim YouTube Channel  and gained official selection status and was nominated for awards at Aesthetica, London Short Film Festival, Berlin Music Video Awards, The Smalls, Stockholm Independent Film Festival.  His work has been mentioned in books including: Dubstep Graphics and Contemporary Colour Theory. Artwork has been featured in Vice  Adult Swim  Tech Crunch  and includes collaborations with musician Tinie Tempah.

Digital art / Crypto Art 
In 2021 this led to an auction at Bonhams He led an artist residency in collaboration with art curator Kamiar Maleki and rapper Tinie Tempah in the French Riveria  He also launched a street art treasure hunt to for an art activity during the pandemic  Art auctioneer Simon De Pury described his collaboration on a podcast with ArtNet. On April 5th 2022, Vector appeared on the popular talk show Waxing Lyrical, with fellow NFT legend Waxbones.

References 

1984 births
Living people
Designers from London
English directors